ISunTV is a blockchains Chinese movies streaming application that supports on the system of IOS, Android App, website and TV. Sun TV is a satellite television channel that launched on August 8, 2000 in Hong Kong. Chen Ping is the current chairman after the shares changed ownership multiple times. Sunshine TV is a Chinese television station that mostly broadcasts history, humanities, finance, current events, and documentaries. The government has now restricted the TV station's signal in mainland China, thus viewers cannot directly see the show on TV, and the official website cannot be accessed from mainland China. However, various mobile applications may be used to see the station's programme and live broadcast.

It covers a wide range of topics, including art, economics, documentaries, history, entertainment, journalism, design, food, architecture, travel, and more. ISunTV is one of Asia's few non-political media platforms that has approved or produced controversial videos such as 十年, the life of Malaysian politician Datuk Anwar Ibrahim. Lin, current head producer of ISunTV and who is an award-winning director and producer.

The company has offices in Hong Kong, Taipei, and New York City. Currently, membership is only available via invitation.

References

External links 
 

Television stations in Hong Kong